Debra Hembree Lambert is an associate justice of the Kentucky Supreme Court and former Judge on the Kentucky Court of Appeals.

Education 

Lambert received her bachelor's degree from Eastern Kentucky University in 1983 and her Juris Doctor from the University of Kentucky College of Law in 1989.

Legal career 

Lambert practiced law in Mount Vernon, Ky. During that time, she also served as an Assistant Commonwealth's Attorney and City Attorney for the City of Mount Vernon.

State judicial career 

In 1999, then-Governor Paul E. Patton appointed her to serve as Circuit Judge, Family Court Division in the 28th Judicial Circuit. In 2007, Judge Lambert resumed her private practice of law in Mount Vernon until her election to the Court of Appeals in 2014.

Consideration for Kentucky Supreme Court 

On August 25, 2017 she made it known that she planned to run for the seat being vacated by Daniel J. Venters. She filed to run on February 1, 2018. She easily won the primary in May 2018, however it led to a runoff between her and her nearest opponent, Daniel Ballou. On November 6, 2018 she gained 66.63% of the vote to Ballou's 33.37%. She assumed office on January 6, 2019.

References

External links 

Year of birth missing (living people)
21st-century American judges
20th-century American lawyers
Eastern Kentucky University alumni
Judges of the Kentucky Court of Appeals
Kentucky lawyers
Justices of the Kentucky Supreme Court
University of Kentucky College of Law alumni
Living people
20th-century American women lawyers
21st-century American women judges